St. Joseph du Moine is an unincorporated area in the Municipality of the County of Inverness, Nova Scotia, Canada. It is on the scenic Cabot Trail near Cape Breton Highlands National Park. Together with Chéticamp, its larger neighbour, Saint-Joseph-du-Moine makes up an Acadian enclave on Cape Breton Island that remains Francophone to this day; the inhabitants speak Acadian French. The Université Sainte-Anne has a campus in Saint-Joseph-du-Moine. 28.7% of the population have a one or three year degree.

Communities in Inverness County, Nova Scotia
Populated places in the Municipality of the County of Inverness, Nova Scotia
General Service Areas in Nova Scotia